Florence C. Benson Elementary School, also known as Wheeler Hill School and the Benson Building, is a historic school building for African-American students located at Columbia, South Carolina. It was built in 1953–1955 in Wheeler Hill, a segregated African-American neighborhood, as an "equalization school." The one-story, three-finger plan school, is built of concrete block with a red brick veneer and reflects influences of the Modern and International styles. The school housed 18 classrooms. The school closed in 1975.

It was added to the National Register of Historic Places in 2009.

References

African-American history of South Carolina
School buildings on the National Register of Historic Places in South Carolina
International style architecture in South Carolina
Buildings and structures in Columbia, South Carolina
National Register of Historic Places in Columbia, South Carolina
School buildings completed in 1955
1955 establishments in South Carolina